Nuevo Celilac is a municipality in the Honduran department of Santa Bárbara.

Demographics
At the time of the 2013 Honduras census, Nuevo Celilac municipality had a population of 8,086. Of these, 67.65% were Mestizo, 26.42% White, 3.35% Indigenous (3.15% Lenca), 2.54% Black or Afro-Honduran and 0.05% others.

References

Municipalities of the Santa Bárbara Department, Honduras